Assan, also confused or used as Hassan, is an Arabian, Anglo-Saxon and Ghanaian surname. It is very common among Ghanaians and some parts of Europe. The surname may be found also among Lebanese refugees of South America who changed their surnames because of the war, as well as in Romanians.

People 
 Amissah Assan (1993-), Ghanaian footballer
 Bazil Assan (1860-1918), Romanian engineer and explorer
 Vitor Assan (1996-), Brazilian musician

See also
Hassan
Assane

References 

Arabic-language surnames
Ghanaian surnames